Wagmatcook 1 is a Mi'kmaq reserve located in Victoria County, Nova Scotia

It is administratively part of the Wagmatcook First Nation.

Indian reserves in Nova Scotia
Communities in Victoria County, Nova Scotia
Mi'kmaq in Canada